Liu Keng-shin (alternately Geng-Shin Liou; ; born 24 January 1982, in Taiwan) is a Taiwanese baseball player who played for the Brother Elephants of the Chinese Professional Baseball League. He played shortstop.

Career statistics

See also
 Chinese Professional Baseball League
 Brother Elephants

References

External links
 

1982 births
Living people
Brother Elephants players
Baseball players from New Taipei